USS Don Marquis (IX-215), an unclassified miscellaneous vessel, was the only ship of the United States Navy to be named for that writer, poet, and artist.  Her keel was laid down by the California Shipbuilding Corporation, in Los Angeles, California, as a Type EC2-S-C1 hull under Maritime Commission contract number 1874. She was launched on 23 August 1943.

She was acquired and placed in service by the Navy on 31 May 1945. She was employed as dry floating storage in the Pacific until returned to the War Shipping Administration on 28 November 1945. Don Marquis was stricken from the Naval Vessel Register on 5 June 1946.

References 

 
 

Dry storage vessels of the United States Navy
Ships built in Los Angeles
Liberty ships
1943 ships
World War II merchant ships of the United States
Steamships of the United States
Maritime incidents in September 1944